The Ariidae or ariid catfish are a family of catfish that mainly live in marine waters with many freshwater and brackish water species. They are found worldwide in tropical to warm temperate zones. The family includes about 143 species.

Taxonomy
The relationships of this family are not yet clear. Two of the genera, Gogo and Ancharius, have been moved to a separate family called Anchariidae. The Ariidae are divided into three subfamilies: Galeichthys is the only genus classified in the subfamily Galeichthyinae and similarly Bagre is the only genus in the subfamily Bagreinae, while the rest of the genera are classified in the subfamily Ariinae.

Previously, the family Ariidae has been grouped in the superfamily Doradoidea, but then it was moved into Bagroidea (along with Austroglanididae, Claroteidae, Schilbeidae, Pangasiidae, Bagridae, Malapteruridae, and Pimelodidae. It has also been classified in a superfamily Arioidea containing Ariidae and Anchariidae.

Distribution and habitat
Ariids are found worldwide in tropical to warm temperate zones. Ariids are unusual among catfish in that they live primarily in the sea; the majority of catfish families are strictly freshwater and have little tolerance for brackish or marine conditions. Ariid catfish are found in shallow temperate and tropical seas around the coastlines of North and South America, Africa, Asia, and Australia.

Many other species of catfish are also present in freshwater habitats; some species only occur in freshwater. In North and South America, about 43 species extend into brackish water or are found exclusively in fresh water.

Appearance and anatomy
Ariid catfish have a deeply forked caudal fin. Usually, three pairs of barbels are present. They possess some bony plates on their heads and near their dorsal fins. At least some species have venomous spines in their dorsal and pectoral fins.

Skull

The gafftopsail catfish is sometimes called the "crucifix catfish" because its dried skull bones resembles a cruciform man. This is an example of pareidolia.

Ecology
Beyond their maritime habitat, ariid catfish have a number of unique adaptations that set them apart from other catfish. Most, if not all species, are mouthbrooding fish, with the male carrying a small clutch of a few dozen, tiny  eggs for about two months until the eggs hatch and the fry become free-swimming.

Relationship to humans

One well-known ariid catfish is the hardhead catfish, Ariopsis felis, abundant along the Western Atlantic coast from Massachusetts to Mexico.

A less-abundant species, more highly regarded as a game and food fish, is the gafftopsail catfish, Bagre marinus.  The range of the gafftop extends further south, to Venezuela.

The smaller ariid catfishes have minor value as public and home aquarium fish. In 1972, the Shedd Aquarium in Chicago received worldwide acclaim for the first successful breeding of Ariopsis felis in captivity, a feat they have repeated several times since. The Colombian shark catfish Sciades seemanni (until recently Hexanematichthys seemanni) is a fairly popular aquarium fish, though it has been traded under a variety of spurious names, such as Arius jordani and Arius seemani. Less commonly traded aquarium species include Arius berneyi and Arius graeffei.

See also
List of fish species that protect their young

References

 
Catfish families
Taxa named by Lev Berg